Canoeing competitions at the 2011 Pan American Games in Guadalajara were held from October 26 to October 29 at the Rowing and Canoeing Course in Ciudad Guzmán. The Canoe Slalom event was dropped due to an anticipated low number of entries. The winners of some events (K1M 200m, K1M 1000m, K1W 200m, K1W 500m, C1M 200m, C1M 1000m) qualified to compete at the canoeing events at the 2012 Summer Olympics in London, Great Britain. The Pan American Games were not a qualification tournament for the Olympics in the events K4M 1,000 and K4W 500.

Medal summary

Medal table

Men's events

Women's events

Schedule
All times are Central Daylight Time (UTC−5).

Qualification

The first five boats in each event qualified from the 2010 Pan American Championship in Mexico City. This gave a total of 110 out of the 130 athlete quotas used. Out of the remaining 20 spots 10 will go to countries not already qualified and the remaining 10 spots will be determined by the Pan American Canoe Federation. Out of the remaining spots, some will be awarded to Mexico if it has not qualified a boat through the Pan American Championship, therefore reducing the remaining number. An NOC can enter a maximum of 16 athletes (10 men and 6 women).

See also
Canoeing at the 2012 Summer Olympics

References

 
Events at the 2011 Pan American Games
Pan American Games
2011
Canoeing and kayaking competitions in Mexico